Colby Raha (born August 30, 1994) is an X Games and motocross competitor. Raha entered X-Games Minneapolis 2017 as a relative unknown rider, but has quickly become one of the most accomplished freestyle riders, racking up several X Games Medals since his debut. Raha is known for his big air, blending his unique BMX background into his FMX tricks, and has gained popularity on social media for his raw street stunts on his dirt bike. In 2020, Real Moto X Games he became the world's first athlete to Grind rail on a Full-Sized Motorcycle.

Raha, grew up in Palmdale, just north of Los Angeles, he grew up with a background in amateur motocross racing. As a minicycle rider he made the AMA Amateur National Motocross Championship four times, but at the age of 14, he gave up riding. During this time he dedicated himself to BMX and landed his first support sponsor from Standard Byke Co. At the age of 16, Colby Raha got into a serious car accident running into a telephone pole which almost cost him his life, it did however result in a DUI along with serious injuries that temporarily took him out of riding. Two years later, Raha had the itch to ride again, picking up a construction job at the age of 18 to pay for a new motorcycle.

He began riding in the hills and playing around with freestyle. In 2015, he would attempt his first backflip straight to dirt without ever using a foam pit for practice and he would land his second attempt.

Competition history
As an unknown he claimed gold in walk-off fashion in QuarterPipe High Air at Minneapolis 2017.

Raha received his first gold in 2017 at X-Games Minneapolis 2017 QuarterPipe High Air. In 2018, Raha would win three medals in the X-Games which included a silver in QuarterPipe High Air, and two bronze medals; one in Step Up and the other in Real Moto. In 2018, Raha would also win the inaugural Quarterpipe event for Nitro World Games. The following year he would go on to win his first Real Moto competition. In 2020, Raha won back to back Real Moto Gold's his clip went viral with over 1.5 million views to date, along with winning a moment of the year from X-Games for the first recorded rail grind on a dirt bike. He has received a total of nine X Games medals.

References

X Games athletes
1994 births
Living people
World record setters in motorcycling